The FIL European Luge Natural Track Championships 2002 took place in Frantschach, Austria.

Men's singles

Women's singles

Men's doubles

Medal table

References
Men's doubles natural track European champions
Men's singles natural track European champions
Women's singles natural track European champions

FIL European Luge Natural Track Championships
2002 in luge
2002 in Austrian sport
Luge in Austria
International sports competitions hosted by Austria